The 31st Light Dragoons was a cavalry regiment of the British Army. It was raised in 1794, by Colonel William St Leger and disbanded on 26 February 1796.

References

Cavalry regiments of the British Army
Dragoon regiments of the British Army
Dragoons
Light Dragoons
1794 establishments
1796 disestablishments